Gray Matters Capital is an impact investing foundation founded by Bob Pattillo. Its mission is to achieve "An education leading to a purpose filled life for 100 Million Women by 2036." GMC is based in Atlanta, Georgia with global offices in Nairobi, Kenya and Bangalore, India. The scale and the use of business practices with social enterprises makes it one of the leaders in impact investing.

Gray Matters Capital's history includes starting Gray Ghost Ventures, the Short Term Liquidity Fund, Gray Ghost Microfinance Fund, GGV Doen Cooperatief, First Light Ventures, Gray Matters India - School Rating System, Gray Matters Kenya, IDEX Accelerator Fellowship, and Village Capital.

History 
The work of Gray Matters Capital started in 2001. Gray Ghost Microfinance Fund led the investment in regional equity funds like Bellwether, Antares, and ASA International that invested in microfinance banks delivering financial services to low-income communities in emerging markets. Over the years GMC has invested in a number of scalable ventures that generate social and financial returns demonstrating the convergence of high social impact with financial returns. GMC has investments that cut across multiple industries such as mobile technology, healthcare, microfinance, energy, and now education. In 2007 GMC began some of the first efforts to finance affordable schools with The Indian School Finance Company and turned its focus toward quality education for underserved women in developing countries. Affordable private schools are booming in poor countries, and this growth is a manifestation of the healthiest of instincts: parents' desire to do the best for their children. The Indian School Finance Company has expanded to six Indian states since it started.

GMC's Activities 
GMC's approach to address the world's most challenging social issues is by investing in sustainable markets. GMC operates for-profit models that are meant to alleviate poverty, promote the dignity of human rights, and enhance the quality of education for low-income communities around the world. All profits and return of capital are then reinvested into the foundation to be redeployed in the next generation of impact enterprises. GMC also invests in human capital and ecosystem development throughout the developing world, and collaborates with investees, and other internal and external stakeholders, to research and support game-changing business concepts. They prioritize their activities according to market demand, and the potential for large-scale social impact and economic returns. Founder Bob Pattillo stated that "by placing major emphasis on social gains, it translates into larger financial returns, which differentiates us from many traditional investors".

Gray Ghost Ventures 
The microfinance work was initiated in the Middle East and North Africa (MENA), where assistance to leaders of Arab microfinance banks created a network called Sanabel. Starting with 17 microfinance institutions (MFIs) serving 170,000 clients, the network grew to 61 MFI's aiding 3 million clients in Morocco, Jordan, Tunisia, Yemen, Syria, and Iraq with the majority of the clients being women. The work in MENA led to the establishment of the Gray Ghost Microfinance Fund, a regional microfinance equity-fund incubator including investment in the Deutsche Bank Microcredit Development Fund and ACCION. The Indian School Finance Company has expanded to six Indian states since it started.

Gray Matters India 
School Ratings Gray Matters Capital invested in research projects examining current practices in Affordable Private Schools in India. The research resulted in a school assessment tool which is used to evaluate and improve education quality across Hyderabad, Bangalore and Mumbai. Over seven years this assessment tool has reached and impacted over 650 schools and over 320,000 students.

In order to scale further the initiative spun off into a separate entity Gray Matters India Private Ltd with an investment from the Michael and Susan Dell Foundation. With dedicated staff, board, and mission, this separate entity is a more sustainable for-profit model and offers assessments to a variety of schools.

IDEX Fellowship 
In 2010, GMC launched the IDEX Accelerator, a professional fellowship program for aspiring social intrapreneurs. IDEX fellows gain hands-on experience addressing the needs of a growing enterprise while earning a Professional Certification in Social Enterprise. IDEX's mission is to develop a knowledgeable and experienced pipeline of human capital for the social enterprise sector. Since 2010, the IDEX Accelerator has transformed from a pilot project of 10 fellows to a global initiative with 200+ alumni.

Village Capital 
Village Capital was established in 2010 within First Light Ventures, a subsidiary of Gray Ghost Ventures. VilCap began with pilots in Mumbai, Boulder, New Orleans, and the Bay Area. It started as an idea inspired by the microfinance village bank, where entrepreneurs select loan recipients from their own group, VilCap "crowd-sources" the most investable companies for investor partners.

It is an innovative investment program built on the hypothesis that entrepreneurs, working intimately together and providing peer support to one another, will be able to efficiently and wisely allocate investment capital to one another's companies. Village Capital improves entrepreneurial success for social ventures and accelerates the impact investing space by building peer support organizations for entrepreneurs in cities throughout the world. Village Capital, through which First Light Ventures made many of its initial investments, is now a stand-alone $12m fund with a separate 501(c)(3) organization working in 18 cities across the globe, supporting hundreds of ventures in clean water, sustainable energy and agriculture, and education. In August 2010 Village Capital was featured in Episode 5 of Season 1 of a series episodes on Entrepreneurship that the Unreasonable Institute launched. Each episode features a new idea or innovation in Entrepreneurship.

Other Education Investment efforts by GMC

WINGS 
In 2014 GMC created Wings Learning Centers, an educational social enterprise that seeks to bridge the education gap in India. Currently Wings has 24 operation centers in Bangalore and Calcutta India. Wings works with another social enterprise Zaya (a partner with GMC) and together they tackle this using blended learning a different learning pedagogy.

Voice4Girls 
Voice4Girls provides tools to be informed, confident, and able to act for young girls throughout India. GMC is the fiscal sponsor and a promoter of VOICE.

Speakwell 
Speakwell Institute for Personal Development and Spoken English is a professionally managed training firm whose aim is to enhance personality development and effective communication with more than 400,000 students to date. As of June 2015, GMC has raised funds to scale to 4,000,000 students.

WorldReader 
GMC invested in World Reader to assist in the India start-up.

Indian School Finance Company 
Gray Ghost Ventures founded the ISFC Company in 2009. The company is the first Non-Banking Finance Company exclusively providing loans to Affordable Schools. From 2009-2012, ISFC has loaned $11 million to 560 low cost private schools. To date the fund stands at $14 million and improved facilities for 1,100,000 children.

Sudiksha Sudiksha 
Sudiksha Sudiksha is chain that offers pre-school to children in low income families in Hyderabad India. Sudiksha got investment from First Light Ventures in 2013 and again in 2015. "GMC invested in Sudiksha because it impacts the education space in India, works with women and creates livelihoods. This venture helped us focus on these three impact areas that we look towards supporting".

References

Educational organizations based in the United States
Microfinance organizations